The 2012–2013 UCI Track Cycling World Cup (also known as the 2012–2013 UCI Track Cycling World Cup, presented by Samsung for sponsorship reasons.) is a multi race tournament over a track cycling. It was the twenty-first series of the UCI Track Cycling World Cup organised by the Union Cycliste Internationale. The series ran from 11 October 2012 to 19 January 2013 and consisted of three rounds in Cali, Glasgow and Aguascalientes.

Series 

The 2012–2013 UCI Track Cycling World Cup consisted of three rounds, in Cali (Colombia), Glasgow (United Kingdom) and Aguascalientes (Mexico).

Cali, Colombia 
The first round of the World Cup was hosted in Cali, the third most populated city in Colombia. Cali has hosted the World Cup on twelve occasions. This round was hosted between 11 and 13 October 2012 at the Unidad Deportiva Alberto Galindo Velodrome.

Glasgow, United Kingdom 
The second round of the World Cup was hosted in Glasgow, the largest city in Scotland. This round was hosted between 16 and 18 November 2012 at the Sir Chris Hoy Velodrome.

The World Cup was the first major competition to be held at the Sir Chris Hoy Velodrome, which was built for the 2014 Commonwealth Games and officially opened on 5 October 2012. Tickets for the event sold out in under an hour when released to the general public; this followed a pre-sale for British Cycling members which sold out in 24 hours.

Aguascalientes, Mexico 
The third round of the World Cup was hosted in Aguascalientes. This round was hosted between 17 and 19 January 2013 at the Aguascalientes Bicentenary Velodrome.

Overall team standings
Overall team standings are calculated based on total number of points gained by the team's riders in each event. The top ten teams after the third and final round are listed below:

Results

Men

Women

References

External links

2012–2013 UCI Track Calendar, UCI
2012 -2013 UCI Track Cycling World Cup – Events, UCI
Cali Start Lists, Results and Analysis, Tissot Timing
Glasgow Start Lists, Results and Analysis, Tissot Timing
Aguascalientes Start Lists, Results and Analysis, Tissot Timing

 
World Cup Classics
World Cup Classics
UCI Track Cycling World Cup